The Municipality of Kostel is a municipality in southern Slovenia. Its seat is the settlement of Vas. It is part of the traditional region of Lower Carniola and is now included in the Southeast Slovenia Statistical Region.

Settlements
In addition to the municipal seat of Vas, the municipality also includes the following settlements:

 Ajbelj
 Banja Loka
 Briga
 Brsnik
 Colnarji
 Delač
 Dolenja Žaga
 Dolenji Potok
 Dren
 Drežnik
 Fara
 Gladloka
 Gorenja Žaga
 Gorenji Potok
 Gotenc
 Grgelj
 Grivac
 Hrib pri Fari
 Jakšiči
 Jesenov Vrt
 Kaptol
 Kostel
 Krkovo nad Faro
 Kuželič
 Kuželj
 Laze pri Kostelu
 Lipovec pri Kostelu
 Mavrc
 Nova Sela
 Oskrt
 Padovo pri Fari
 Petrina
 Pirče
 Planina
 Poden
 Podstene pri Kostelu
 Potok
 Puc
 Rajšele
 Rake
 Sapnik
 Selo pri Kostelu
 Slavski Laz
 Srednji Potok
 Srobotnik ob Kolpi
 Štajer
 Stelnik
 Stružnica
 Suhor
 Tišenpolj
 Vimolj
 Vrh pri Fari
 Zapuže pri Kostelu

References

External links

Municipality of Kostel on Geopedia
Kostel municipal site

 
Kostel